Kalaranjini is an Indian actress who started her career in the early 1980s.

Personal life
Kalaranjini is divorced and has a son, Prince.

Partial filmography

Malayalam

Tamil

Telugu

Kannada

Television career

Reality shows
 Lunars Comedy Express (Asianet Plus) as Special judge
 Comedy Stars (Asianet) as Judge

Shows/Other works
 JB Junction (Kairali TV)
 Shoot N Show (Kairali TV)
 Star Family (Amrita TV)
 Varthakkappuram (Asianet News)
 Ennile Njan (ACV)
 Asianet Film Awards 2016
 Flowers Awards Night
 Malayalam Super Star Nite
 Rim Showtime
 Nana
 Celespot Media
 Mahilaratnam
 Vanitha
 The Hindu
 Grihalakshmi

References

External links
 

Indian film actresses
Actresses from Thiruvananthapuram
Living people
Actresses in Malayalam cinema
20th-century Indian actresses
21st-century Indian actresses
Actresses in Telugu cinema
Actresses in Kannada cinema
Actresses in Tamil cinema
Indian television actresses
Actresses in Malayalam television
Actresses in Tamil television
Year of birth missing (living people)
Child actresses in Malayalam cinema